The 1970–71 Durand Cup Final was the 66th final of the Durand Cup, the oldest football competition in India, and was contested between Kolkata giants East Bengal and Mohun Bagan on 4 February 1971 at the Corporation Stadium in New Delhi.

East Bengal won the final 2–0 to claim their 6th Durand Cup title. Mohammed Habib scored both the goals in the final as East Bengal lifted their sixth Durand Cup title.

Route to the final

Match

Summary
The Durand Cup final began at the Corporation Stadium in New Delhi on 4 February 1971 in front of a packed crowd as Kolkata giants East Bengal and Mohun Bagan faced each other in a Kolkata Derby. East Bengal reached their eighth Durand Cup final after defeating Mafatlal  1–0 in the semi-final, having won the tournament five times previously in 1951, 1952, 1956, 1960, and 1967. Mohun Bagan reached their ninth Durand Cup final after they defeated another Kolkata giant Mohammedan Sporting 3–0 in the semi-final, having won the tournament six times previously in 1953, 1959, 1960, 1963, 1964, and 1965. -

East Bengal started the game with a positive intent and made multiple attacks at the Mohun Bagan goal and took the lead in the tenth minute when Ashok Chatterjee found Mohammed Habib open inside the box and the latter made no error to make it 1–0. East Bengal kept on attacking in the first half however, failed to increase their lead as the teams went onto halftime break. The second half began in the same way like the first and East Bengal doubled their lead in just ten minutes of the half when Mohammed Habib once again scored with a brilliant header from a cross by Swapan Sengupta to make it 2–0. East Bengal defence lead by Sudhir Karmakar, Syed Nayeemuddin, Sunil Bhattacharya and Santo Mitra managed to hold onto the lead as East Bengal lifted their sixth Durand Cup title.

Details

References

External links
Durand Cup Finals

Durand Cup finals
1970–71 in Indian football
East Bengal Club matches
Football competitions in Kolkata